Marshall Gelfand (December 14, 1927 - April 1, 2021) was an American music entrepreneur and founder of an entertainment business management firm called Gelfand. He was also the manager to iconic musicians like Bob Dylan and Neil Diamond. He was paid tribute by the 64th Annual Grammy Awards for his contributions.

References

1927 births
2021 deaths